The 17th Golden Horse Awards (Mandarin:第17屆金馬獎) took place on November 3, 1980 at Sun Yat-sen Memorial Hall in Taipei, Taiwan.

Winners and nominees 
Winners are listed first, highlighted in boldface.

References

17th
1980 film awards
1980 in Taiwan